Krzysztof Kotorowski (born September 12, 1976 in Poznań) is a retired footballer from Poland, goalkeeper.

Career
Kotorowski was a product of Olimpia Poznań's youth team and broke into their senior squad. After the club's controversial merger and relocation, he played for many years for Dyskobolia Grodzisk Wielkopolski. He returned to Poznań in 2004 where he played for Lech ever since.

Career statistics

Footnotes

A.  The "League Cup" column constitutes appearances and goals (including those as a substitute) in the Ekstraklasa Cup which was played between 1999–2002 and 2006–2009.

Honours

Club
Lech Poznań
 Ekstraklasa (2): 2009-10, 2014–15
 Polish Cup (1): 2008-09

References

External links

 

1976 births
Living people
Footballers from Poznań
Polish footballers
Association football goalkeepers
Dyskobolia Grodzisk Wielkopolski players
Lech Poznań players
Ekstraklasa players